Bulancakspor, established  in 1926, is a Turkish association football club based in Bulancak, Giresun Province.

The club is currently playing in group 4 of TFF 3. Lig. Bulancakspor has won the FIFA fairplay prize for getting no red cards during 101 games from 1990 till 1994.

League participations 

TFF First League: 1989–1990
TFF Second League: 1984–1989, 1990–2005
TFF Third League: 2005

Current squad 
As of August 28, 2008, according to the official website.

References

External links 
Bulancakspor

Association football clubs established in 1926
Football clubs in Turkey
1926 establishments in Turkey